Museum für dörfliche Alltagskultur (English: Museum of daily village culture) is a museum in Saarland, Germany.

External links
Official site

Museums in Saarland